Urlaub auf Ehrenwort (translated as Leave on Word of Honour) is a 1955 West German drama film directed by Wolfgang Liebeneiner and starring Claus Biederstaedt, Eva Ingeborg Scholz and Reinhard Kolldehoff. It is a remake of the 1939 film Urlaub auf Ehrenwort about German soldiers granted leave during the Second World War.

The film's art direction was by Willi Herrmann and Wilhelm Vorwerg.

Cast

References

Bibliography 
 Williams, Alan. Film and Nationalism. Rutgers University Press, 2002.

External links 
 

1955 films
West German films
German drama films
1955 drama films
1950s German-language films
Films directed by Wolfgang Liebeneiner
Films set on the home front during World War II
Remakes of German films
German black-and-white films
1950s German films